The Wrecking Crew: How Conservatives Rule (August 2008) is a book written by American journalist and historian Thomas Frank, which explores the contemporary state of conservative-governed Washington, D.C. Frank summarized the message of his book: "Bad government is the natural product of rule by those who believe government is bad."  Frank argues that certain elements of the Republican Party intentionally dismantled the government by many means, including turning public policy into a private-sector feeding frenzy. Frank describes the state of the federal government of the United States as analogous to a large group of privatized pigs feeding at the public trough, which was brought on by the privatization schemes engineered by the Republicans. This book follows Frank's New York Times bestseller, What's the Matter with Kansas?

External links
Thomas Frank's page for The Wrecking Crew
Thomas Frank Publisher's webpage (Henry Holt and Co.)
The Wrecking Crew's Publisher's webpage (Henry Holt and Co.)
Bill Moyers interview with Thomas Frank 
Salon.com Thomas Frank interview "Thomas Frank on the Bush administration: Sabotage by design"
NPR Thomas Frank interview "Thomas Frank's Indictment of Conservatism"
Democracy Now Thomas Frank interview
New York Post book review
Louisville Kentucky Courier-Journal book review "The Right in power"

2008 non-fiction books
Books about politics of the United States
Henry Holt and Company books
Books critical of conservatism in the United States
Books by Thomas Frank